The 1941–42 season in Swedish football, starting August 1941 and ending July 1942:

Honours

Official titles

Competitions

Promotions, relegations and qualifications

Promotions

Relegations

Domestic results

Allsvenskan 1941–42

Allsvenskan promotion play-off 1941–42

Division 2 Norra 1941–42

Division 2 Östra 1941–42

Division 2 Västra 1941–42

Division 2 Södra 1941–42

Division 2 promotion play-off 1941–42 
1st round

2nd round

Norrländska Mästerskapet 1942 
Final

Svenska Cupen 1941 
Final

National team results 

 Sweden: 

 Sweden: 

 Sweden: 

 Sweden:

National team players in season 1941/42

Notes

References 
Print

Online

 
Seasons in Swedish football